Cryptosepalum exfoliatum is a species of tree native to tropical Africa. It is the dominant tree species in the Zambezian Cryptosepalum dry forests ecoregion of Zambia and Angola, where it is known locally as "mavunda". Cryptosepalum exfoliatum forests form habitat for the butterfly Mylothris mavunda.

Subspecies
 subsp. craspedoneura
 subsp. craspedoneuron
 subsp. exfoliatum
 var. exfoliatum
 var. fruticosum
 subsp. pseudotaxus
 subsp. puberulum
 var. pubescens
 subsp. suffruticans

References

External links
Flowers and foliage - Flora of Zambia

exfoliatum
Flora of Angola
Flora of Zambia
Taxa named by Émile Auguste Joseph De Wildeman